John E. Proctor (January 14, 1844 – December 14, 1944) was an American politician in the state of Florida. A former slave, he served in the Florida House of Representatives from 1873 to 1875, and 1879 to 1881, and in the Florida State Senate from 1883 to 1885. Though he was born free, he was sold as a slave at a young age to pay off debts that his father had incurred.

See also
African-American officeholders during and following the Reconstruction era

References

1844 births
1944 deaths
American centenarians
Men centenarians
Members of the Florida House of Representatives
Florida state senators